Diagnosis is the identification of the nature and cause of a certain phenomenon.

Diagnosis may also refer to: 
 Diagnosis (Polish TV series), a 2017 thriller medical drama
 Diagnosis (American TV series), a 2019 documentary web television series
 Diagnosis (artificial intelligence), concerned with the development of algorithms and techniques that are able to determine whether the behaviour of a system is correct